Tasta is a borough of the city of Stavanger which lies in the southwestern part of the large municipality of Stavanger in Rogaland county, Norway. The borough is located in the northern part of the city. The  borough has a population (2016) of 15,379.

Prior to 2020, the eastern half of the island of Åmøy was also included in this borough, but starting in 2020 that area has been part of the borough of Rennesøy.

The local sports clubs are Tasta IL and Vardeneset BK.

Neighbourhoods
Although the borders of "neighbourhoods" do not correspond exactly to the borough borders, Tasta roughly consists of the following neighbourhoods: Indre Tasta and Ytre Tasta.

Politics
Tasta borough is led by a municipal borough council. The council consists of 11 members, with the following party allegiances:

References

Boroughs and neighbourhoods of Stavanger